is a greatest hits album by Japanese singer/songwriter Chisato Moritaka, released on March 25, 1995. The album marked Moritaka's return to active touring after being sidelined with a temporomandibular joint dysfunction for two years. It covers her singles from 1990 to 1995 and includes the new song "Kyō kara". A limited edition release included a 60-page photo book. The album was released on MiniDisc by zetima on December 23, 1998.

The album peaked at No. 2 on Oricon's albums chart and sold over 1.34 million copies. It also placed at No. 10 on Oricon's 1995 year-ending albums chart. In addition, it was Moritaka's first and only album to be certified Million and Triple Platinum by the RIAJ.

Track listing 
All lyrics are written by Chisato Moritaka; all music is composed and arranged by Hideo Saitō, except where indicated.

Personnel 
 Chisato Moritaka – vocals, drums, guitar, piano, Fender Rhodes (1, 15)
 Yuichi Takahashi – guitar, synthesizer, tambourine (1, 15)
 Yasuaki Maejima – Fender Rhodes, synthesizer (1)
 Taisei – organ (15)
 Masafumi Yokoyama – bass (1)
 Yukio Seto – bass (15)

Charts

Certification

References

External links 
  (Chisato Moritaka)
  (Up-Front Works)
 
 

1995 compilation albums
Chisato Moritaka compilation albums
Japanese-language compilation albums
Zetima compilation albums